Elas por Elas was a 1982 telenovela Brazilian created by Cassiano Gabus Mendes and directed by Paulo Ubiratan.

Cast

References

External links 
 Official website

Brazilian telenovelas
TV Globo telenovelas
Portuguese-language telenovelas
1982 telenovelas